Alyth market cross is a mercat cross located in Alyth, Perth and Kinross, Scotland. Now Category B listed, it dates to 1670. It has a rectangular shaft three feet and three inches tall (shortened from the original eight inches and standing on a five-inch-tall pedestal). It has an octagonal head, which is inscribed with "E 1A" and a lion rampant. It was erected by James Ogilvy, 2nd Earl of Airlie. It is the initials of Ogilvy's wife that adorn the head of the cross.

Now back near its original location, in an elevated position in a retaining wall, it was moved to Alyth's Albert Street.

See also
 List of listed buildings in Alyth, Perth and Kinross

References

Buildings and structures in Perth and Kinross
Category B listed buildings in Perth and Kinross
1760 establishments in Scotland
Monumental crosses in Scotland